Michael-Junior Czyborra (born 24 July 1997) is a German footballer who plays as a defender for VSG Altglienicke.

Career
Czyborra made his professional debut for Energie Cottbus in the 3. Liga on 22 April 2016, coming on as a substitute in the 68th minute for Felix Geisler before being taken off in the 90+2nd minute for Malte Karbstein in the 1–0 away win against VfB Stuttgart II.

Personal life
Czyborra's brother, Lennart, is also a professional footballer.

References

External links
 
 Profile at kicker.de

1997 births
Living people
Footballers from Berlin
German footballers
Association football defenders
FC Energie Cottbus players
3. Liga players
Regionalliga players
VSG Altglienicke players